Mihajilo Popović (born 1 January 1993) is a Serbian professional footballer who plays as a right-back for MFK Tatran Liptovský Mikuláš.

Club career

ŠKF Sereď
Popović made his Fortuna Liga debut for Sereď against Žilina on 25 July 2021.

References

External links
 ŠKF Sereď official club profile 
 
 Futbalnet profile 
 

1993 births
Living people
People from Ruma
Serbian footballers
Serbian expatriate footballers
Association football defenders
RFK Novi Sad 1921 players
K.A.S. Eupen players
FK Dubnica players
MŠK Rimavská Sobota players
FK Slovan Duslo Šaľa players
FK Donji Srem players
MFK Lokomotíva Zvolen players
KFC Komárno players
MFK Skalica players
ŠKF Sereď players
MFK Tatran Liptovský Mikuláš players
Challenger Pro League players
Serbian First League players
2. Liga (Slovakia) players
Slovak Super Liga players
Expatriate footballers in Belgium
Serbian expatriate sportspeople in Belgium
Expatriate footballers in Austria
Serbian expatriate sportspeople in Austria
Expatriate footballers in Slovakia
Serbian expatriate sportspeople in Slovakia